Dean Brody (born August 12, 1975) is a Canadian country music artist who has won 16 CCMA Awards and 2 JUNO Awards. Originally signed to Broken Bow Records in 2008, Brody made his debut later that year with the single "Brothers". This song, a Top 40 country hit in the US, was the first single from his self-titled debut album, released in 2009 under the production of Matt Rovey. In 2010, Brody was signed to Open Road Recordings and released his second album, Trail in Life. In 2012, he released his third album, Dirt, earning the 2012 CCMA Album of the Year award and a 2013 Juno nomination for Country Album of the Year. Brody also won the 2012 and 2013 CCMA Male Artist of the Year award. Brody's fourth album, Crop Circles, was released in 2013. Brody's fifth album, Gypsy Road, was released in 2015. Brody's sixth album, Beautiful Freakshow, was released in 2016, and he subsequently earned the singer 3 Awards at the 2017 CCMA Awards show, including Fan's Choice, Songwriter of the Year and Top-Selling Canadian Single of the Year for "Bush Party". In 2020, Brody landed the record for the most played song ever in a single week at Canadian country radio with "Canadian Summer", which was included on his seventh album Boys. He is the only Canadian country artist to have headlined the Budweiser Stage in Toronto for six consecutive years.

Biography
Dean Brody was born in Smithers, British Columbia and grew up in Jaffray, British Columbia. As a boy, Brody worked at a sawmill, also playing guitar in his spare time. By 2004, he had moved to Nashville, Tennessee to pursue his musical career. Although he found a songwriting contract, the expiration of his US work permit forced him to move back to Canada. Eventually, he returned to Nashville through the suggestion of producer Keith Stegall, who helped him sign with Broken Bow Records in 2008. Brody released his debut single, "Brothers", late that year. Shortly before its release, Brody was injured in a waterskiing accident on the Potomac River and had to undergo extensive reconstructive surgery. Brody lived in Windsor, Nova Scotia and Chester, Nova Scotia from 2010 to 2017. In 2020, he launched his own beer, "Hucklejack Canadian Lager". Brody has run the "Dean Brody Foundation", which supports global initiatives, since the early 2010s.

Music career

2009–2011: Dean Brody and Trail in Life
Brody's self-titled debut album was released in the United States on April 28, 2009, via the independent label Broken Bow Records. The album debuted at Number 32 on the U.S. Billboard Top Country Albums chart, and was released in Canada on May 12, 2009. "Brothers" peaked at number 26 in the US. "Dirt Road Scholar" and "Undone" were both released in Canada and "Gravity" in the United States.

The first single from Brody's second album, "Wildflower", was released in April 2010. A second single, "Roll That Barrel Out", was released in July 2010. The album, Trail in Life, was released by Open Road Recordings in August 2010. Other singles included the title track, "People Know You by Your First Name" and "Little Yellow Blanket".

2012–2014: Dirt and Crop Circles
Brody's third studio album, Dirt, was released by Open Road Recordings on April 24, 2012. Its first single, "Canadian Girls", became Brody's first song to reach the top 40 on the Canadian Hot 100 and his first certified gold digital single. Brody sold out his first headline Dirt Tour across Canada in 2012.

Brody's fourth studio album, Crop Circles, was released on November 5, 2013. The lead single, "Bounty", was released on August 19. It was followed by the title track in December 2013, "Another Man's Gold" in April 2014 and "Mountain Man" in September 2014.

2015–2017: Gypsy Road and Beautiful Freakshow
Brody's fifth studio album, Gypsy Road, was released on April 21, 2015. The lead single, "Upside Down", was released on February 9. The album's second single, "Bring Down the House", was released to Canadian country radio on May 25, 2015. The album's third single, "Love Would Be Enough", was released to Canadian country radio on October 23, 2015. The album's fourth single, "Monterey", was released to Canadian country radio in March 2016.

Brody's sixth studio album, Beautiful Freakshow, was released on October 21, 2016. The album's lead single, "Bush Party" released to Canadian country radio on 2016, and was certified Platinum by Music Canada. The album also included Brody's third number one hit "8th Day", as well as the Platinum-certified "Beautiful Freakshow" and Gold-certified "Time". In 2017, Brody headlined the Budweiser Stage in Toronto, Ontario for the first tine.

2018–2019: Black Sheep
On April 26, 2019, Brody released the EP Black Sheep, which featured four singles, "Good Goodbye", "Dose of Country", the platinum-certified "Whiskey in a Teacup", and "Black Sheep", all of which charted in the top ten of the Canadian Country charts. He co-headlined a tour across Canada with fellow Canadian country artist Dallas Smith.

2020–present: Boys
In February 2020, Brody independently released the single "Can’t Help Myself" with The Reklaws through his own label, Scurvy Dog Music. The song reached No. 1 on the Billboard Canada Country chart and No. 49 on the Canadian Hot 100. It was officially the most played song ever at Canadian country radio in a single week on the Nielsen BDS charts with 1782 spins. In June 2020, Brody released the single "Canadian Summer". It would become his second consecutive No. 1 at Canadian Country radio, and fifth overall, while breaking the previous record at Canadian country radio set by "Can't Help Myself" with 1817 spins.

Brody released his seventh album, Boys on November 18, 2020. The title track "Boys" was released as the third single to country radio off the album and featured American country singer Mickey Guyton. The song would also reach #1 on the Canada Country chart. "Lightning Bug" was released to radio as the fourth single off the album in April 2021. Brody then collaborated with fellow Canadian country artist Jade Eagleson on "More Drinkin' Than Fishin'", and released "I'd Go to Jail" as the fifth single from Boys.

In May 2022, he released the new single "Where'd You Learn How to Do That". The song would go on to become Brody's eight number one in Canada, and he followed it up with the release of "You Got the Wrong Guy" in October 2022.

Discography

Dean Brody (2009)
Trail in Life (2010)
Dirt (2012)
Crop Circles (2013)
Gypsy Road (2015)
Beautiful Freakshow (2016)
Black Sheep (2019)
Boys (2020)

Awards and nominations

References

External links

1975 births
Canadian country singer-songwriters
Canadian male singer-songwriters
Living people
BBR Music Group artists
Open Road Recordings artists
People from Smithers, British Columbia
Musicians from British Columbia
Canadian Country Music Association Male Artist of the Year winners
Canadian Country Music Association Songwriter(s) of the Year winners
Juno Award for Country Album of the Year winners
Canadian Country Music Association Single of the Year winners
21st-century Canadian male singers
Canadian Country Music Association Fans' Choice Award winners
Canadian Country Music Association Album of the Year winners